"The Jaunt" is a horror short story by Stephen King first published in The Twilight Zone Magazine in 1981, and collected in King's 1985 collection Skeleton Crew. The story takes place early in the 24th century, when the technology for teleportation, referred to as "Jaunting", is commonplace, allowing for instantaneous transportation across enormous distances, even to other planets in the Solar System. The term "Jaunting" is stated within the short story to be an homage to The Stars My Destination, a science fiction novel by Alfred Bester.

Plot 
In the distant future, humans have developed a form of instantaneous teleportation called "the Jaunt", enabling colonization of the Solar System. Mark Oates and his family are preparing to travel to Mars for a two-year business trip. As the Jaunting service prepares the other passengers, Mark entertains his two children by recounting a semi-apocryphal tale of the discovery and history of the Jaunt. He explains how in 1987 a scientist named Victor Carune inadvertently discovered the ability to Jaunt after years of research when he accidentally teleported two of his own fingers. Although the procedure functioned perfectly when he tested inorganic objects, Carune discovered a side-effect on the mice sent through his two portals. The mice would either die instantly or behave erratically before dying moments later. He eventually discovered that beings of higher neural activity, such as animals and humans, could only survive the Jaunt while unconscious. Mark explains that this is why all people must undergo general anesthesia before Jaunting. 

Mark spares his children a gruesome account of the first conscious human to experience the Jaunt, a condemned death-row murderer named Rudy Foggia who had been promised a full pardon upon taking part in the experiment. After six other inmates were Jaunted under the effects of anesthesia, Foggia emerged and managed to say "It's eternity in there" before dying of a heart attack. Scientists had come to conclude that while Jaunting is physically carried out almost instantly, to a conscious mind it lasts an indeterminately long amount of time, perhaps millions of years, leading to a conscious person simply being left alone with their thoughts in an endless field of white. Mark attempts to present this fact in a gentle way as to not frighten his children or his wife as, unlike him, they are Jaunting for the first time.

After Mark finishes his story, the family is subjected to sleeping gas and Jaunted to Mars. Upon awakening, Mark is horrified to find that his adventurous son Ricky deliberately held his breath while being administered the anesthesia to experience the Jaunt while conscious and has been rendered completely insane. Ricky shrieks "Long Jaunt, Dad! Longer than you think!" over and over, and begins gouging his own eyes out as he is wheeled away from his terrified family by several attendants.

Television adaptation  
In 2015, it was announced that the story was set for a film adaptation by Andy Muschietti before he opted to realise King's It instead.

As of January 2021, the story is due to be made into a television series for MRC by Fear The Walking Dead co-creator Dave Erickson.

References

See also
 Stephen King short fiction bibliography

1981 short stories
Short stories set on Mars
Short stories by Stephen King
Teleportation in fiction
Works originally published in American magazines
Works originally published in horror fiction magazines
Fiction set in the 24th century